Rami Yagafarovich Garipov (12 February 1932 – 20 February 1977), was a national poet of Bashkortostan, writer and playwright.

Biography 
The national poet of Bashkortostan Rami Yagafarovich Garipov was born February 12, 1932, and in the village Arkaul Salavat district Bashkir ASSR (Bashkir Republic). He graduated from a seven-year school in his native village, then studied at Ufa secondary school No.9

Between 1950and 1955 Garipov was a student at the Maxim Gorky Literature Institute (Moscow). After the Institute he worked in the editorial offices of the newspaper Council of Bashkortostan, the magazine Agidel and the editor of fiction Bashkir book publishing house. In 1959-1964 Rami Garipov lived in his native land, worked as a secretary of the Komsomol (Youth) organization of the Yuryuzan collective farm and the Sargamysh state farm of the Salavat district, and the department head of the Salavat regional newspaper.

In 1964-1966 he was a literary employee of the newspaper "Council of Bashkortostan", and in 1968-1972 Executive Secretary of Bashkortostan Kyzy magazine. Rami Garipov began to be published in 1950. The first poem was published in the journal Әthәbi Bashkortostan ’in 1950. The first book of poems "Yuryuzan" (1954) was a thesis of a student of the Literary Institute. He dedicated the collections of poems “Stone Flower” (1958), “Song of the Lark” (1964) to his native land, nature, and his countrymen. In the subsequent collections “Flight” (1966), “The Treasured Word” (1969), “Rowan” (1974), one can feel an attraction to philosophical lyrics.

Reflections on the meaning of life, on the historical fate of the people, on the spiritual connection of generations, anxiety for the future of their native language and culture - defined the essence of the poetry of R. Garipov. He often turns to Bashkir poetry, especially the Kubair genres and classical folk songs. The great merit of R. Garipov in the revival and development of these genres.

R. Garipov is also known as a master of literary translation, from the poetry of Alexandr Pushkin, Mikhail Lermontov, Sergei Yesenin , Alexander Blok, Heinrich Heine, Rudaki, Rasul Gamzatov and others. He also translated the collections of short stories into the Bashkir language Ivan Franko “To the Light” (1959). The poet fruitfully worked on translations of the ruby Omar Khayyam. The result of his translation work was the book “My Anthology” (1991).

For the critical attitude to Soviet national politics, the talented poet R. Garipov was persecuted. Many poems remained unpublished during the life of the poet. Written in 1964, the poem "1937" was released only in 1987. Member of Union of Writers of the USSR since 1960 a, from where he was expelled for a poem about love of his native language.

Died of heart failure February 20, 1977. He was buried in Muslim Cemetery of Ufa. Rami Garipov was posthumously awarded the title People's poet of Bashkortostan (1992). Posthumously awarded the Republican Prize named after Salawat Yulayev (1988) with the wording "For the poetry works published in recent years".

His wife Nadezhda Vasilievna (Ukrainian) raised the poet’s children in the spirit of respect for the Bashkir people and the Bashkir language.

The most famous poem by Rami Garipov is “Tugan tel” (“Native language”).

The February blizzard 

Don’t believe the February blizzard.

There’s no guile in it, it never harms…

Let it ragе without some rest and sleep,
 
The beautiful spring is in its arms.

Everybody will live on the Earth,

Except you and me. I am not sure

How I can leave this world, my darling…

What a pity - I will not endure…

( translated by R. Yumadilova)

Bibliography 
 Works. - In 3 vols. - Ufa, 1996-1998 
 Yuryuzan. Poems. - Ufa, 1954 
 Stone Flower. Lyrics. - Ufa, 1958, 
 Lark songs. - Ufa, 1964 
 Flight. Poems. - Ufa, 1966
 The coveted word. - Ufa, 1969 
 Rowan. Poems. - Ufa, 1974
 Star thoughts. Poems. - Ufa, 1979
 Snowdrop song. - Ufa, 1981 * My anthology. Translations. - Ufa, 1990 
 Alyrimkosh and Birmamkosh. Selected works. - Ufa, 1992
 Campion. Poems. - Ufa, 1969.  
 Return. Poems and poem. / Foreword M. Karima. - Moscow, 1981.

Memory 

In the village Arkaulovo of the Salavat district, a house museum was opened, a bust of the poet was installed. A documentary about life and work was created.

The name of Rami Garipov is:
 Bashkir Republican Gymnasium No. 1;
 A street in the village Arkaulovo;
 In November 1990, a Rami Garipov Prize was established.
 In the city of Ufa there is a street of Rami Garipov.
 In the town of Meleuz there is Rami Garipov street
 In the village Kadyrovo Kugarchinsky district, the main street is named after the poet.

Literature 
  Karim M.  Letter to Rami Garipov. - Ufa, 1960.
  Karim M.  Face to the rising sun. - Ufa, 1960. 
  Timergalina R.  Rami Garipov. Writers of Bashkortostan. - Ufa, 1968. 
  Gainullin M., Khusainov G.  Writers of Soviet Bashkiria. - Ufa, 1988.
 `` Khusainov G . Words of the will. About Rami Garipov. The poets. - Ufa, 1981.
 History of Bashkir literature. In 6 volumes. - T. 5. - Ufa, 1994.
  Bikbaev R. '' The poet’s word is the poet’s conscience. - Ufa, 1997.

Notes

Links 
 digitized works in National Library named after Akhmet-Zaki Validi of the Republic of Bashkortostan
 in the Bashkir language
 other sources
 Rami, the beginning of the journey - Ravil Bikbai
 Mazhit Alkin “Strokes to the Portrait of Rami Garipov”
 Article of memory

References

1932 births
1977 deaths
Bashkir poets
People from Salavatsky District
Soviet writers
Socialist realism writers
Soviet poets
Maxim Gorky Literature Institute alumni